ICRF 193 is a topoisomerase inhibitor.

References

Imides
Diketopiperazines
Topoisomerase inhibitors